Cecil County is a county located in the U.S. state of Maryland at the northeastern corner of the state, bordering both Pennsylvania and Delaware. As of the 2020 census, the population was 103,725. The county seat is Elkton. The county was named for Cecil Calvert, 2nd Baron Baltimore (1605–1675), the first Proprietary Governor of the Province (colony) of Maryland. With the eastern part of the county being closer to Philadelphia than to Baltimore, it is part of the Philadelphia-Camden-Wilmington, PA-NJ-DE-MD Metropolitan Statistical Area. The county is located in Wilmington's Radio Market and Baltimore's Designated Market Area.

History

The area now known as Cecil County was an important trading center long before the county's official organization in 1674 by proclamation of Lord Baltimore. It had previously been a northeastern part of a much larger Baltimore County, in the northeastern portion of the Province. This had included present-day Baltimore City and county,  Harford, Carroll, eastern Frederick, and portions of Howard and Anne Arundel counties. At the time of its founding, Cecil County also included modern Kent County and the border on the Eastern Shore of the Chesapeake Bay went as far south as the Chester River, until its later formation in 1706.  The Piscataway traded with the Susquehannocks near Conowingo, and with Lenape of the Delaware valley and their Nanticoke allies near the Elk River and Elk Neck Peninsula. A southern tribe sometimes called the Shawnace also moved into what later became North East, Maryland. Captain John Smith visited the area in 1608. William Claiborne, a Puritan trader based in Virginia, earlier established a trading post at what is now known as Garrett island at the mouth of the Susquehanna River near what became Perryville. Bohemian immigrant Augustine Herman lobbied for Cecil County's creation, and drew the 1674 maps, in exchange for which Herman received extensive land grants, including one developed as Bohemia Manor, where he eventually died. Another early developer was George Talbot, appointed Surveyor-General of Maryland in 1683, who came from Ballyconnell, County Cavan, Ireland. Talbot's original grant of land in Susquehanna, Cecil County is viewable online. Its subsequent history is told in the Crofton Papers, page 153.

Until the American Revolution, Cecil County was an important shipping center, both within the colonies and abroad. It exported not only its own agricultural products but also animal skins from the west and tobacco from the south. St. Francis Xavier Church (Warwick, Maryland) begun as a Jesuit mission in 1704 and rebuilt in 1792, is one of Maryland's oldest churches, though now a museum. St. Mary Anne's Episcopal Church, authorized in 1706 and rebuilt in 1742 is another (and still in use, as well as maintaining a historic graveyard). West Nottingham Academy, founded by Presbyterian Rev. Samuel Finley in 1744, educated Benjamin Rush and Richard Stockton, both of whom signed the Declaration of Independence, and still operates today (though disaffiliated from the Presbyterian church and with additional buildings). The Principio Furnace, founded in 1719, became an important exporter of pig iron. During the American Revolution both British and colonial troops traveled through Cecil County, although no major battles occurred within its borders. The Battle of Cooch's Bridge occurred in nearby Delaware, and both General Howe and General George Washington stopped in Elkton during the summer of 1777. Robert Alexander, the area's delegate to the Continental Congress of 1776, spoke with both sides but ultimately decided to go into exile in England without his wife.  She remained a loyal Marylander and received a life estate in some of Elkton property that Maryland confiscated.

The War of 1812 caused Cecil County considerable damage. Not only did British Admiral George Cockburn blockade the upper Chesapeake Bay, in response to musket fire from colonials at Welch Point, his troops destroyed a trading post known as Frenchtown. They tried to sail further up the Elk River to the county seat at Elkton, but turned back under fire from Fort Defiance, also hindered by a cable across the navigation channel. British troops also destroyed most of Havre de Grace in nearby Harford County, Maryland. Cockburn's ships then traveled up the Sassafras River, and, meeting resistance, destroyed Georgetown, Maryland and Fredericktown, Maryland. Avoiding Port Deposit which rumors called heavily defended, the British destroyed the Principio Iron Works, an important military target.

Port Deposit boomed after the Susquehanna Canal opened in 1812. Engineer James Rumsey, who grew up in Bohemia Manor before moving to Bath, Virginia (or Berkeley Springs, West Virginia), invented a steamboat which he demonstrated to George Washington, before traveling to London to secure patents against competition from John Finch. Rumsey died there in 1792, but his lawyer brother Benjamin Rumsey moved south to Joppa, Maryland and served as Maryland's Chief Justice for 25 years. Steamboats, using technology such as by Robert Fulton, came to dominate travel on the bay during the following decades. The Eagle, built in Philadelphia in 1813, transported travelers between Baltimore and Elkton, where they connected with stagecoaches to travel to Wilmington, Philadelphia and other points north. An 1802 attempt to build a canal to connect the Elk River to Christiana, Delaware (connecting the Chesapeake and Delaware watersheds) failed within two years. However, between 1824 and 1829, with financial support from the states of Maryland, Delaware and Pennsylvania, over 2600 workers built the 14 miles long Chesapeake and Delaware Canal, which became for a while the busiest canal in the new nation. The U.S. Army Corps of Engineers still operates it today, and Chesapeake City, Maryland, which had been Bohemia Manor until 1839, has a museum explaining the canal's importance. Railroads and bridges also proved economically important to Cecil County and surrounding region. The New Castle and Frenchtown Railroad began service in 1831. Railroads crisscrossed Cecil county within three decades, although they ultimately greatly reduced its importance as a trading center. Cities such as Philadelphia and Baltimore could achieve economies of scale impossible for the county's small Chesapeake ports. Even the railroad's Frenchtown section was abandoned in 1859, and the port became a ghost town (though other sections remain in use, operated by the Norfolk Southern Railway).

During the American Civil War, Perryville, Maryland became an important staging ground for Union troops. It had been the halfway point of the railroad line between Wilmington and Baltimore, but damage to the section into Baltimore caused Union troops to embark ferries at Perryville. No Civil War battles occurred in Cecil County, but residents had strongly divided loyalties. Slavery had declined from 3,400 slaves in the county in 1790 to just 800 in 1850. The Underground Railroad had crossed through Cecil County, perhaps assisted by the 'Fighting Quaker,' former Congressman and U.S. Marshall John Conard, who moved to North East between 1834 and 1851 and was reburied at St. Mary Anne's Episcopal Church there`after his death in Philadelphia in 1857. Frederick Douglass crossed Cecil County on his road to freedom in 1838. While Jacob Tome made his fortune in the area and stayed, other Cecil County natives left in search of economic opportunity. David Davis moved to Illinois upon graduating from Yale Law School in 1835, where he became Abraham Lincoln's law partner and later served in that legislature as well as a judge, before moving to Washington D.C. to help President Lincoln, who later named him to the United States Supreme Court. Slavery's abolition affected many local property owners, as well as their slaves. After the war, Perryville again became a railroad town, and later received business from interstate highway travelers crossing the Susquehanna bridges. Although Cecil County had once been one of the wealthiest in Maryland and has worked hard recently to attract industry as well as tourist dollars, the average income of residents is now near that of Americans as a whole.

From the start, Cecil County's future was shaped by its strategic location between the growing cities of Baltimore, Philadelphia, Washington, D.C., and New York.  In the 20th century, as modern highways arrived its placement along the heavily traveled northeast corridor brought new opportunities and change to the county.  By June 1941, the final segment of the Philadelphia Road, the new dual highway designated as Route 40 was completed across the center of Cecil County.   In 1943, the dual highway was dedicated as the Pulaski Highway, to honor the Polish patriot and friend of Revolutionary American, according to the Baltimore Sun.  Soon new motels, restaurants, and gas stations started sprouting up along what was once rural fields and woods.

On Nov. 14, 1963, President John F. Kennedy visited Cecil County to formally open and dedicate the Northeastern Expressway (I-95).  Motorists were relieved to be "on the clear new road" one editor noted in the Baltimore Sun.  After President Kennedy was assassinated in Dallas, I-95 was rededicated as the John F. Kennedy Memorial Highway.  As traffic started zipping along the superhighway, without one light halting the fast trip, a corridor that would yield major dividends to the county had opened.  It spurred business growth along the route, as commercial, industrial, and residential development clustered near the interchanges in the decades ahead.

In 2013, the county became a Second Amendment sanctuary.

Cecil County has a number of properties on the National Register of Historic Places.

Politics, government and law
In the early post-Civil War period, Cecil County, having been generally pro-secession, leaned strongly towards the Democratic Party. It was carried by the Democratic Party nominee in every Presidential election between 1868 and 1920 except that of 1896 when the Northeast was vigorously opposed to William Jennings Bryan’s “free silver” policy. Since Dwight Eisenhower carried the county in 1952, Cecil County has become a solidly Republican county. The last Democrat to carry the county was Jimmy Carter in 1976.

Prior to December 3, 2012, Cecil County was governed by county commissioners, the traditional form of county government in Maryland. On that date, Cecil County began governance under a new charter approved via voter referendum in November 2010, which authorized an elected County Executive and a five-member County Council, which separates the legislative and executive functions of local government (unlike the old "board of commissioner" system). Cecil County thus joined most of the other larger, increasingly urban and complex county governments in central Maryland with county executive-county council forms (such as Baltimore, Harford, Anne Arundel, Howard, Prince George's, and Montgomery counties). Elected on November 3, 2020, Danielle Hornberger (R) is the current County Executive.

In addition, Cecil County is an area that has some home rule in its towns, in places such as Perryville and North East, who have town governments, and hence have minimal county reliance.

|}

Geography

Cecil County is in the northeast corner of Maryland, bounded on the north and east by the Mason–Dixon line with Pennsylvania and Delaware.  The western border is defined by the lower reaches of the Susquehanna River and the northernmost coves, flats and tributaries of the Chesapeake Bay.  On the south, the county is bounded by the Sassafras River and Kent County, Maryland.  The county is part of the Delmarva Peninsula as well as Maryland's "Eastern Shore."

Topographically, Cecil County straddles the border between the rolling hills of the Piedmont Plateau north of U.S. Route 40 and the flatlands of the Atlantic Coastal Plain to the south.  The highest and most rugged hills are found in the northwestern and north-central parts of the county, reaching  just south of the Mason–Dixon line near Nottingham, Pennsylvania and just east of U.S. Route 1. The lowest elevation is sea level along the Chesapeake Bay.

Cecil County is primarily rural, with denser development around the county seat of Elkton and along U.S. Route 40.  The county is bisected from east to west by the Chesapeake and Delaware Canal, which connects the Delaware River to the Chesapeake Bay by way of the Elk River.  The canal passes through the town of Chesapeake City, where a high-level bridge facilitates the passage of large ships beneath Maryland Route 213.

Cecil County is also bisected east-to-west by Interstate 95, known as the John F. Kennedy Memorial Highway in Maryland.  The highway provides a major artery for traffic between the Baltimore-Washington area to the southwest and the Philadelphia and New York/New Jersey regions to the northeast.  The Office of Management and Budget has designated Cecil County as part of the Philadelphia-Camden-Wilmington metropolitan area.

Adjacent counties
 Chester County, Pennsylvania (north)
 Lancaster County, Pennsylvania (northwest)
 New Castle County, Delaware (east)
 Harford County (west)
 Kent County (south)

Climate
Cecil County has a humid subtropical climate (Cfa) except in higher northern areas where a hot-summer humid continental climate (Dfa) exists. There are four distinct seasons and seven months average above 50 °F (10 °C.) The hardiness zone is mostly 7a.

Transportation

Major roads and highways

Public transportation
The county operates Cecil Transit, which provides fixed-route bus and demand responsive transport service throughout Cecil County.

The northern terminus of MARC's Penn Line commuter rail service to Baltimore and Washington, D.C. is in Perryville. Recently, the Wilmington Area Planning Council conducted a study on the travel patterns of residents in the county, and they suggested that the MARC line extends from Perryville up to Newark or even Wilmington,  where it meets SEPTA and Amtrak lines.

The county is one of only two areas on Amtrak's Acela that does not have local services.

Demographics

2020 census

Note: the US Census treats Hispanic/Latino as an ethnic category. This table excludes Latinos from the racial categories and assigns them to a separate category. Hispanics/Latinos can be of any race.

2010 census
As of the 2010 United States Census, there were 101,108 people, 36,867 households, and 26,681 families living in the county. The racial makeup of the county was 89.2% white, 6.2% black or African American, 1.1% Asian, 0.3% American Indian, 1.0% from other races, and 2.2% from two or more races. Those of Hispanic or Latino origin made up 3.4% of the population.

Of the 36,867 households, 36.8% had children under the age of 18 living with them, 54.7% were married couples living together, 12.0% had a female householder with no husband present, 27.6% were non-families, and 21.8% of all households were made up of individuals. The average household size was 2.70 and the average family size was 3.13. The median age was 38.9 years.

The median income for a household in the county was $64,886 and the median income for a family was $75,742. Males had a median income of $54,379 versus $39,933 for females. The per capita income for the county was $28,640. About 6.3% of families and 9.0% of the population were below the poverty line, including 12.2% of those under age 18 and 7.8% of those age 65 or over.

2000 census
As of the census of 2000, there were 85,951 people, 31,223 households, and 23,292 families living in the county. There were 34,461 housing units at an average density of 99 per square mile (38/km2). The racial makeup of the county was 93.4% White, 3.9% Black or African American, 0.3% Native American, 0.7% Asian, <0.1% Pacific Islander, 0.5% from other races, and 1.2% from two or more races.  1.5% of the population were Hispanic or Latino of any race. 17.9% were of German, 16.1% Irish, 13.8% English, 13.8% American and 6.5% Italian ancestry.

There were 31,223 households, out of which 37.0% had children under the age of 18 living with them, 58.6% were married couples living together, 11.1% had a female householder with no husband present, and 25.4% were non-families. 19.9% of all households were made up of individuals, and 7.1% had someone living alone who was 65 years of age or older.  The average household size was 2.71 and the average family size was 3.12.

In the county, the population was spread out, with 27.7% under the age of 18, 7.5% from 18 to 24, 31.2% from 25 to 44, 23.2% from 45 to 64, and 10.5% who were 65 years of age or older.  The median age was 36 years. For every 100 females, there were 98.20 males.  For every 100 females age 18 and over, there were 95.70 males.

The median income for a household in the county was $50,510, and the median income for a family was $56,469. Males had a median income of $40,350 versus $28,646 for females. The per capita income for the county was $21,384.  About 5.4% of families and 7.2% of the population were below the poverty line, including 9.2% of those under age 18 and 7.7% of those age 65 or over.

Maryland state planning data suggest that the population of the county could double in the next thirty years, reaching 160,000 by 2030.

As of the 2010 Census, the racial makeup of Cecil County was 87.4% Non-Hispanic white, 6.2% black, 0.3% Native American, 1.1% Asian, 0.1% Pacific Islander, 0.1% Non-Hispanics of some other race, 1.8% Non-Hispanics of two or more races and 3.4% Hispanics.

Cecil County is home to a small Amish community in the Cecilton area that was founded in 1999. Amish families moved to the area from Lancaster County, Pennsylvania because of increasing costs and the declining amount of farmland there.

Education
There are 17 elementary schools, six middle schools, five high schools, and the Cecil County School of Technology, which specializes in career and technology education, all operated by Cecil County Public Schools. Cecil County schools acts as the school district for the entire county.

Cecil College has four campuses in Cecil County.

Libraries
There are 7 branches of the Cecil County Public Library and the Library also does significant outreach throughout the county.

Crime rates 
The 2017 census accounted a population of 102,746 people. On a scale of one, being low crime, to 100, being high crime, these statistics compare Cecil County's crime rates to US crime averages. In regards to violent crime, which includes murder and nonnegligent manslaughter, forcible rape, robbery, and aggravated assault, the rate is 40.8 compared to the U.S. average of 31.1. In property crime, including offenses being burglary, larceny-theft, motor vehicle theft, and arson, the rate is 39.3 compared to the U.S. average of 38.1.

Populated areas
Towns

Cecilton
Charlestown
Chesapeake City
Elkton (county seat)
North East
Perryville
Port Deposit
Rising Sun

Unincorporated communities

Blue Ball Village
Calvert
Carpenter Point
Childs
Colora
Conowingo
Earleville
Elk Mills
Elk Neck
Fair Hill
Fredericktown
Perry Point
Red Point
Warwick
Westminister
White Crystal Beach

Notable people
John Smith, (1580–1631), the first White man to explore what is now known as Cecil County
William Paca, (1740–1799), a Statesman and Revolutionary War leader, served Continental Congress and was later the Governor of Maryland, signer of the Declaration of Independence
George Read, (1733–1798), judge and Revolutionary War Statesman, served as a member of 2nd Continental Congress, later became a U.S. Senator and Delaware State Chief Justice
Robert Alexander, born in Cecil County, delegate to the Continental Congress
 John Andrews, (1746–1813), professor and clergyman
 Robert Somers Brookings, founder of the Brookings Institution
 Emma Alice Browne (1835–1890), poet
 Annie McCarer Darlington (1836–1907), poet
 David Davis, Associate Supreme Court Justice
 Levi Davis, Illinois State Auditor and lawyer

In popular culture
In MacKinlay Kantor's If the South Had Won the Civil War, Cecil County counter-secedes from Maryland to join the State of Delaware, following Maryland's secession from the U.S. after R.E. Lee's victory against the U.S. at Gettysburg.

See also

 Cecil Whig - the local newspaper.
National Register of Historic Places listings in Cecil County, Maryland
Cecil County Sheriff's Office
Cecil County Circuit Courthouse
Long Creek (Back Creek tributary)

References

External links
Cecil County government

 

 
1674 establishments in Maryland
Populated places established in 1674
Maryland counties on the Chesapeake Bay